In fractional calculus, an area of mathematical analysis, the differintegral (sometime also called the derivigral) is a combined  differentiation/integration operator. Applied to a function ƒ, the q-differintegral of f, here denoted by

is the fractional derivative (if q > 0) or fractional integral (if q < 0).  If q = 0, then the q-th differintegral of a function is the function itself.  In the context of fractional integration and differentiation, there are several legitimate definitions of the differintegral.

Standard definitions

The four most common forms are:

The Riemann–Liouville differintegralThis is the simplest and easiest to use, and consequently it is the most often used. It is a generalization of the Cauchy formula for repeated integration to arbitrary order. Here, . 
The Grunwald–Letnikov differintegralThe Grunwald–Letnikov differintegral is a direct generalization of the definition of a derivative.  It is more difficult to use than the Riemann–Liouville differintegral, but can sometimes be used to solve problems that the Riemann–Liouville cannot. 
The Weyl differintegral This is formally similar to the Riemann–Liouville differintegral, but applies to periodic functions, with integral zero over a period.
The Caputo differintegralIn opposite to the Riemann-Liouville differintegral, Caputo derivative of a constant  is equal to zero. Moreover, a form of the Laplace transform allows to simply evaluate the initial conditions by computing finite, integer-order derivatives at point .

Definitions via transforms

The definitions of fractional derivatives given by Liouville, Fourier, and Grunwald and Letnikov coincide. They can be represented via Laplace, Fourier transforms or via Newton series expansion.

Recall the continuous Fourier transform, here denoted :

Using the continuous Fourier transform, in Fourier space, differentiation transforms into a multiplication:

So,

which generalizes to

Representation via Newton series is the Newton interpolation over consecutive integer orders:

For fractional derivative definitions described in this section, the following identities hold:

Basic formal properties

Linearity rules 

Zero rule 
Product rule 

In general, composition (or semigroup) rule is a desirable property, but is hard to achieve mathematically and hence is not always completely satisfied by each proposed operator; this forms part of the decision making process on which one to choose:

  (ideally)
  (in practise)

See also
 Fractional-order integrator

References

External links
 MathWorld – Fractional calculus
MathWorld – Fractional derivative
Specialized journal: Fractional Calculus and Applied Analysis (1998-2014) and Fractional Calculus and Applied Analysis (from 2015)
Specialized journal: Fractional Differential Equations (FDE)
Specialized journal: Communications in Fractional Calculus
 Specialized journal: Journal of Fractional Calculus and Applications (JFCA)

 https://web.archive.org/web/20040502170831/http://unr.edu/homepage/mcubed/FRG.html
 Igor Podlubny's collection of related books, articles, links, software, etc. 

Fractional calculus
Generalizations of the derivative
Linear operators in calculus